The Mad Marriage is a lost 1921 American silent drama film directed by Rollin S. Sturgeon and starring Carmel Myers. It was produced and distributed by Universal Film Manufacturing Company.

Cast
Carmel Myers as Jane Judd
Truman Van Dyke as Jerry Paxton
William Brunton as Willie
Virginia Ware as Mrs. Brendon
Maragaret Cullington as Harmonia
Jane Starr as Althea
Arthur Edmund Carewe as Christiansen 
Nola Luxford as Bob
Lydia Yeamans Titus as Mrs. Boggs

References

External links

Film still at findagrave.com

1921 films
American silent feature films
Lost American films
Universal Pictures films
1921 drama films
American black-and-white films
Silent American drama films
Films directed by Rollin S. Sturgeon
1921 lost films
Lost drama films
1920s American films